Masiphya is a genus of flies in the family Tachinidae.

Species
M. brasiliana Brauer & von Bergenstamm, 1891
M. confusa Aldrich, 1925
M. cunina (Reinhard, 1961)
M. floridana (Townsend, 1912)
M. irrisor (Reinhard, 1962)
M. townsendi Aldrich, 1925

References

Exoristinae
Diptera of North America
Tachinidae genera
Taxa named by Friedrich Moritz Brauer
Taxa named by Julius von Bergenstamm